Linus Malmborg (born 16 February 1988) is a Swedish footballer who plays as a defender, most recently for Vasalunds IF.

References

External links

Linus Malmborg at Fotbolltransfers

1988 births
Living people
Swedish footballers
Association football defenders
Superettan players
Allsvenskan players
Östers IF players
IFK Värnamo players
Vasalunds IF players
Gefle IF players
Assyriska FF players